Anthocomus is a genus of beetles in the family Melyridae.
The species of this genus are found in Europe and North America.

Species
 Anthocomus apalochroides Abeille de Perrin, 1891
 Anthocomus bipartitus Wittmer, 1982
 Anthocomus creticus Evers, 1994
 Anthocomus denticornis Wittmer, 1986
 Anthocomus doria Baudi di Selve, 1873
 Anthocomus equestris (Fabricius, 1781)
 Anthocomus fasciatus (Linnaeus, 1758)
 Anthocomus flaveolus Abeille, 1883
 Anthocomus haeres Abeille, 1883
 Anthocomus humeralis Morawitz, 1861
 Anthocomus inimpressus Wittmer, 1982
 Anthocomus miniatus (Kolenati, 1846)
 Anthocomus pristinus (Fall, 1901)
 Anthocomus pupillatus Abeille de Perrin, 1890
 Anthocomus rufus (Herbst, 1784)
 Anthocomus thalassinus (Abeille, 1883)

References

Melyridae
Cleroidea genera